The 2007 International Challenge Cup was held between March 7 and 11, 2007 in The Hague. Skaters competed in the ladies' single skating across the levels of senior, junior, novice, and the pre-novice discipline called "Debs".

Results

Senior ladies

Junior ladies

Novice ladies

Debs ladies

External links
 2007 International Challenge Cup (Archived 2009-05-16)

International Challenge Cup, 2007
Figure skating in the Netherlands